Cheshmeh Murineh (also Romanized as Cheshmeh Mūrīneh) is a village in Nurabad Rural District, in the Central District of Delfan County, Lorestan Province, Iran. At the 2006 census, its population was 72, in 15 families.

References 

Towns and villages in Delfan County